Hemanta Vincent Biswas (born 13 December 1995) is a Bangladeshi professional footballer who plays as a midfielder for Sheikh Russel KC. He became the first Bangladeshi footballer to get a trial at a top European club (FC Twente).

Career

Club
Hemanta Vincent Biswas made top division debut with Dhaka Mohammedan  in 2013. After playing for the Blacks And Whites, he moved to Sheikh Russel KC in the 2014-15 season.

International

U20
He made his U20 debut as a captain in 2014 AFC U-19 Championship qualification against host side, Iraq U-20 in 2013.

Bangladesh beat Kuwait U-20 by 1-0 under his captaincy in the same qualifying round.

U23
Hemanta made his U23  debut against Nepal U-23 in 2014 in an international friendly.

Senior Team
Hemanta made his senior debut against India in 2014 in an international friendly.

He scored his first international goal against Sri Lanka in 2015 Bangabandhu Cup.

Honours
Mohammedan SC
 Independence Cup: 2013–14

Chittagong Abahani
 Sheikh Kamal International Club Cup: 2015

International goals

Club
Chittagong Abahani

National Team
Scores and results list Bangladesh's goal tally first.

References

Living people
1995 births
Bangladeshi footballers
Bangladesh international footballers
Bangladeshi Christians
Mohammedan SC (Dhaka) players
Sheikh Russel KC players
Association football midfielders
Footballers at the 2014 Asian Games
Bashundhara Kings players
Asian Games competitors for Bangladesh